Cameron Historic District is a national historic district located at Cameron, Moore County, North Carolina. The district encompasses 61 contributing buildings in the town of Cameron.  It was developed between 1875 and 1925 and includes notable examples of Late Victorian and Bungalow / American Craftsman style architecture.  Notable buildings include the Cameron Presbyterian Church (c. 1879), Murdock McKeithen House (c. 1885), John C. Muse House (c. 1878), McLean House (c. 1920), McFadyen House (c. 1878), Rodwell House (c. 1890s), Muse Brothers Store (c. 1880s), McKeithen Store (c. 1880s), Greenwood Inn (c. 1874), Cameron Methodist Church (c. 1886), L. B. McKeithen House (1923), Borst House (c. 1883), Parker House (c. 1918), and Turner-McPerson House (c. 1867, 1910s).

It was added to the National Register of Historic Places in 1983.

References

Historic districts on the National Register of Historic Places in North Carolina
Victorian architecture in North Carolina
Buildings and structures in Moore County, North Carolina
National Register of Historic Places in Moore County, North Carolina